The Muhlenberg Area School District is a mid-sized, suburban, public school district serving parts of Berks County, Pennsylvania. It encompasses the borough of Laureldale and the Muhlenberg Township. Per the 2000 federal census data it served a resident population of 20,064. By 2010, the district's population declined to 23,562 people. In 2009, the district residents’ per capita income was $21,417, while the median family income was $51,356. In the Commonwealth, the median family income was $49,501 and the United States median family income was $49,445, in 2010.

The district operates four schools: Muhlenberg Elementary Center (K-3), C.E. Cole Intermediate School (4-6), Muhlenberg Middle School (7-9), and Muhlenberg High School (10-12) school. The 9th grade moved from the high school to the middle school in the 2010–2011 school year. The 4th grade moved from the elementary school to the intermediate school in the 2018–2019 school year.  All four of the schools share the same campus and are separated by athletic fields. The district is one of the 500 public school districts of Pennsylvania.

High school students may choose to attend Reading Muhlenberg Career and Technology Centers  for training in the trades. The Berks County Intermediate Unit IU14  provides the district with a wide variety of services like specialized education for disabled students and hearing, speech and visual disability services and professional development for staff and faculty.

School board
The official name of the school board is the Board of Education of the Muhlenberg School District.

Members
President
Garrett Hyneman (D/R)
Vice President
Otto W. Voit, III (R)
Secretary
Cindy L. Mengle (D/R)
Treasurer
Richard E. Hoffmaster (D/R)
Assistant Secretary 
Janet Howard (D/R)
Other Members
Kristyna Eagle (D)
J. Tony Lupia, Jr. (D/R)
Mark J. Nelson (D/R)
Miguel Vasquez (R)

Extracurriculars
Muhlenberg School District offers a variety of clubs, activities and an extensive sports program.

Sports
The district funds:

Boys
Baseball - AAAA
Basketball- AAAA
Bowling - AAAA
Cross Country - AAA
Football - AAA
Golf - AAAA
Soccer - AAA
Swimming and Diving - AAA
Tennis - AAA
Track and Field - AAA
Water Polo - AAAA
Wrestling - AAA

Girls
Basketball - AAAA
Bowling - AAAA
Cheerleading
Cross Country - AAA
Field hockey - AAA
Golf - AAA
Soccer (Fall) - AAA
Softball - AAA
Swimming and Diving - AAA
Girls' Tennis -AAA
Track and Field - AAA
Volleyball - AAA
Water Polo - AAAA

Middle School Sports

Boys
Baseball
Basketball
Cross Country
Football
Soccer
Track and Field
Wrestling	

Girls
Basketball
Cross Country
Field Hockey
Softball 
Track and Field
Volleyball

According to PIAA directory July 2013

References

School districts in Berks County, Pennsylvania